Have Guitar Will Travel is the third studio album by rock and roll musician Bo Diddley. It was released on the Checker Records label in 1960.

The front cover of Diddley's album displays a white calling card similar to that which Richard Boone's Have Gun – Will Travel character Paladin carried and gave out on every episode of the series. The location was  Livingston Street, Brooklyn, New York City

History
The song "Cops and Robbers" was released as an A-side of Checker single #850 in November 1956; the B-side "Down Home Special" did not appear on this album. The song "Mona (I Need You Baby)" was released as the B-side to "Hey! Bo Diddley" in October 1957, the A-side appearing on the album Bo Diddley in 1958. "Say Man, Back Again" was released as a single in November 1959. The rest of the songs were album-only releases, although an edited version of "She's Alright", lacking vocal overdubs, had appeared as the B-side of "Say Man, Back Again."

Cover versions
Several songs on Have Guitar Will Travel were covered by many British Invasion bands. Originally recorded and released in 1956 by Boogaloo and his Gallant Crew led by singer Kent Harris (reissued on the Road Songs collection by Frémeaux et Associés), "Cops and Robbers" was recorded by The Rolling Stones, The Masters Apprentices, Wayne Fontana & the Mindbenders, Downliners Sect, and George Thorogood.

Track listing

Personnel
Per liner notes
Bo Diddley – vocals, guitar
Jerome Green – co-lead vocals on "Say Man, Back Again", maracas, background vocals
Peggy Jones – guitar, background vocals
Willie Dixon – bass
Clifton James – drums
Frank Kirkland – drums
Jody Williams – guitar
Lafayette Leake – piano
Lester Davenport – harmonica on "Spanish Guitar"

Charts
"Say Man, Back Again" reached #23 on the R&B Singles chart.

Release history

References

Bo Diddley albums
1960 albums
Checker Records albums
Albums produced by Bo Diddley
Chess Records albums
Albums produced by Phil Chess
Albums produced by Leonard Chess